Johnny Urquhart (3 February 1925 – 16 December 2008) was a Scottish football player and administrator.

Early life 
Urquhart was born in Kirkcaldy, Scotland. While at Kirkcaldy High School, he played football. At the same time, he also played for the local Boys' Brigade team.

Career 
After school, Urquhart played in the local juvenile league for Kirkcaldy Old Boys. He then had trials with Rovers and East Fife. His scoring debut in maroon was October 14, 1944.

He played for Raith Rovers in the 1949-50 season, Heart of Midlothian from 1951 to 1955, and once played for the Scottish League XI. He was on the 1954  Heart of Midlothian team which won the League Cup. While in Tynecastle, he played in 248 games and scored 79 goals.

After retiring as a player in the early 1960s, Urquhart served Raith Rovers in several roles, including coach, scout, director, club chairman and president.

Personal life 
Urquhart married Ena with whom he had three sons: Brian, John, and Alan. He owned linoleum, carpet, and flooring firm in Kirkcaldy.

References

1925 births
2008 deaths
Footballers from Kirkcaldy
Association football wingers
Scottish footballers
Heart of Midlothian F.C. players
Raith Rovers F.C. players
Scottish Football League players
Chairmen and investors of football clubs in Scotland
Raith Rovers F.C. non-playing staff
Scottish Football League representative players
20th-century Scottish businesspeople